Tigran Hovhannisyan (born 5 December 1974) is a retired Armenian football midfielder.

References

1974 births
Living people
Soviet footballers
Armenian footballers
FC Malatia players
Araks Ararat FC players
Erebuni-Homenmen FC players
Spartak Yerevan FC players
FC Lernagorts Kapan players
FC Mika players
Lernayin Artsakh FC players
FC Ararat Yerevan players
FC Gandzasar Kapan players
Ulisses FC players
Association football midfielders
Armenia international footballers
Soviet Armenians